Ulrichstein is a small town in the Vogelsbergkreis in Hesse, Germany.

Geography

Location
Ulrichstein lies in the Vogelsberg Mountains 500 m above sea level and is thereby Hesse's highest town. It is a recognized state-approved climatic spa and lies near the High Hoherodskopf nature reserve

Northeast of town is the source of the river Ohm, the "Omquelle"

Neighboring communities
Ulrichstein borders in the north on the community of Feldatal, in the east on the community of Lautertal, in the south on the town of Schotten, in the southwest on the town of Laubach (Gießen district), and in the west on the community of Mücke.

Constituent communities
In 1972, the town of Ulrichstein and the communities of Kölzenhain, Feldkrücken and Rebgeshain from the Lauterbach district, along with the communities of Bobenhausen, Helpershain, Ober-Seibertenrod, Unter-Seibertenrod and Wohnfeld from the Alsfeld district merged into a new municipality, today's town of Ulrichstein.

References

External links
 Offizielle Website

Vogelsbergkreis
Grand Duchy of Hesse